Inao  may refer to:
 Iñao National Park and Integrated Management Natural Area, a protected area in the Chuquisaca Department Bolivia
 Inao Station, a railway station in Ōmachi, Nagano Prefecture, Japan
 Inao (epic), a story from Thai literature adapted from the Panji tales
 Kazuhisa Inao (1937–2007), a Japanese professional baseball pitcher
Indian National Astronomy Olympiad, the national stage for selecting the Indian team for the International Olympiad on Astronomy and Astrophysics.

INAO may refer to :
 Institut National des Appellations d'Origine, a French organization charged with regulating French agricultural products